Sierra Sky Park is a fly-in unincorporated community in Fresno County, California.

References

See also
Sierra Sky Park Airport

Unincorporated communities in California
Unincorporated communities in Fresno County, California